Hashknife Hartley is an American old-time radio Western program. It was broadcast on the Mutual Broadcasting System from July 2, 1950, until December 30, 1951.

Schedule
Hashknife Hartley began as a summer replacement series, filling the time slot of Juvenile Jury. Paired with Hopalong Cassidy in the following half-hour, the substitution gave Mutual a one-hour Western block on Sunday afternoons. In September 1950, the block was extended to 90 minutes when Bobby Benson and the B-Bar-B Riders was added in the half-hour before Hashknife Hartley.

Format
The program featured the adventures of Hashknife Hartley and Sleepy Stevens, characters created by W.C. Tuttle, who served as narrator. Hartley was a western detective, and Stevens was his sidekick; the pair traveled around the old West, solving crimes in various towns.

Hashknife
The word "hashknife" has two meanings in the context of western adventures.

A hashknife was a tool that camp cooks used to slice beef cubes in preparation for making corned beef hash. That implement also was the basis for a cattle brand that was designed to foil rustlers by making it difficult to superimpose a new brand over the existing brand. The Vandevert family, which developed the brand, became known as "the Hashknife Outfit", and in turn that group inspired the printed stories and the radio program.

Personnel
Frank Martin in the title role and Barton Yarborough as Stevens had the only two regular roles in the series. Don McCall was the announcer. Tom Hargis was the producer and director. Writers Fred Luke and Burt Kennedy adapted Tuttle's stories into scripts.

References

External links

Streaming
Hashknife Hartley episodes from Old Time Radio Researchers Group Library

1950 radio programme debuts
1951 radio programme endings
1950s American radio programs
Mutual Broadcasting System programs
Western (genre) radio series
Period radio series